The Turkey Day Classic is a college football game, traditionally held annually on Thanksgiving Day. Originally, it was played between Alabama State University and Tuskegee University, two historically black universities. The game was originally played in Montgomery, Alabama's  Cramton Bowl, but relocated to Alabama State's new Hornet Stadium in 2012. The game is one of two black college football classics to be associated with Thanksgiving weekend; the other is the younger, but more widely known, Bayou Classic, held two days later. 

The game fell into a category of classics that feature two rival teams playing each year. The activities surrounding the game take place over several weeks in the downtown of Montgomery, and include parades, parties, and the like. Many classics feature activities and events like golfing, pageants, and tailgating. Alabama State hosts a parade and combines its homecoming with the Turkey Day Classic.

History
The 1924 game was the first in the series and it is considered the first black college football classic. Tuskegee refused tournament slots for the NCAA Division II National Football Championship because the Division II playoffs conflict with the Turkey Day Classic; the Golden Tigers program did this even in successful seasons where it has qualified and earned high playoff seeding. From 1998 to 2009, Tuskegee participated in the Pioneer Bowl, representing its conference nine times in the 11 Pioneer Bowls in that span and winning eight. Similarly, Alabama State and other Southwestern Athletic Conference members opt out of contention for the NCAA Division I Football Championship; this accommodates the Turkey Day Classic, the Bayou Classic in New Orleans, any weather-related reschedulings (such as the 2017 Labor Day Classic) and, during the game's existence, the SWAC Championship Game. SWAC members instead contend for the Celebration Bowl.

Beginning in 2013, Tuskegee withdrew from the contest due to playoff considerations beginning that year. Tuskegee's opting into the playoffs forced the cancellation of the Pioneer Bowl, but the Turkey Day Classic continued, with Stillman College serving as the opponent.

In 2014, Alabama State announced it was officially discontinuing the Turkey Day Classic in order to give itself the option of participating in the Division I championship, should it qualify. For two years, the college held its homecoming on the penultimate Saturday of November; that is, the Saturday before Thanksgiving. Stillman College remained the Hornets' opponent for 2014.

In August 2015, it was announced that the Alabama State-Tuskegee rivalry was to resume in 2017, with these games being held in early September and nicknamed the Labor Day Classic (ambiguously, since another black college football rivalry and Canadian college and professional football Labour Day games also use the name). For the 2015 season, Miles College participated in the November Hornet Homecoming.

In March 2016, it was announced that the Turkey Day Classic would return to its traditional date of Thanksgiving Day, with Miles College returning as Alabama State's opponent. For the 2017 Turkey Day Classic, Alabama State was originally scheduled to host Cheyney University of Pennsylvania, a team it had never faced before, but Cheyney backed out of the contest two weeks beforehand and suspended its football program indefinitely due to the school's ongoing financial problems. Edward Waters College, an NAIA squad whom Alabama State had played once before in its history, agreed to take Cheyney's place on short notice.

The 2018 Turkey Day Classic was contested by a conference rival, Mississippi Valley State University; that university, which won the 1971 contest, had been the only team other than Tuskegee or Alabama State to win the Turkey Day Classic in its history. The move was made in an effort to boost falling attendance and attention for the event, which had failed to sell out the games against other D-II and NAIA opponents. (The strategy was unsuccessful, as attendance continued to fall, and the game went untelevised, as ESPN, the game's previous telecaster, declined to carry the game on any of its outlets.)

The 2019 game featured Prairie View A&M, another division rival, as the Hornets' Thanksgiving Day opponent; the Panthers became the second team other than Tuskegee or Alabama State to win with its 20–17 win over the Hornets.

The 2020 game was effectively canceled due to the COVID-19 pandemic in the United States, as both teams' member conferences cancelled all fall 2020 athletics. For 2021, Tuskegee returned to its traditional spot on the Thanksgiving Day schedule, with the game being carried over the top on ESPN+. University of Arkansas–Pine Bluff served as the Hornets' opponent in 2022, upsetting the home team by staving off a comeback to win, 19–14.

Game results
NOTE: no game in 2020.

(*) Game was decided in overtime

See also
List of black college football classics
American football on Thanksgiving

References

External links
Alabama State University: Turkey Day Classic

Alabama State Hornets football
Tuskegee Golden Tigers football
Sports in Montgomery, Alabama
Thanksgiving (United States)
1924 establishments in Alabama
Recurring sporting events established in 1924
American football in Alabama
Black college football classics